Râul Lupului may refer to:

 Lupul, a tributary of the Bahlui in Iași County
 Valea Lupului, a tributary of the Homorod in Satu Mare County